Baljit Singh "Bally" Sagoo (Punjabi: ਬਲਜੀਤ ਸਿੰਘ ਸੱਗੂ, born 19 May 1964) is a British-Indian record producer and DJ. Born in Delhi, India, Sagoo was raised in Birmingham, England. He entered the recording and entertainment industries in 1989. He is the figurehead of the UK/Belgium-based entertainment company, Fresh Dope Industries.

Early life
Sagoo grew up in the Balsall Heath area of Birmingham. His father Saminder Sagoo ran his own retail music outlet in the 1970s, after playing in The Musafirs in the late 1960s.

In his teens, Sagoo developed a taste for reggae, soul and disco. He spent his college years producing mix-tapes for friends and dee-jaying at local events. These home-made creations fused Western dance and hip hop with Indian music.

Career 
In 1989, Oriental Star Agencies, UK based record label, asked him to remix a Punjabi track called "Hey Jamalo". The single became a hit and Sagoo joined OSA as their full-time in-house producer. Through this relationship, he released his first album, Wham Bam which spawned a sequel, Wham Bam 2. Other material during this period included Star Crazy and Sagoo's 1991 collaboration with Nusrat Fateh Ali Khan on Magic Touch.

1990s
In 1994, Sagoo signed with Sony Records to produce Bollywood Flashback. He became the first Indian artist to reach national mainstream radio when the album track "Chura Liya" (a re-working of Asha Bhosle's song) was played on BBC Radio 1.  This was followed in 1996 by his first, all-original work Rising from the East, which included "Dil Cheez" and "Tum Bin Jiya". Subsequently, he featured on the album Dance Attack and composed another remix music video, Mera Laung Gawacha. Starring Deepti Bhatnagar and Jas Arora, the video was directed by Polygram Multimedia, and became a hit in the UK. Sagoo made it onto Top of the Pops.  He toured India with Michael Jackson on the HIStory Tour, produced the Aby Baby album with Amitabh Bachchan and was invited to New Delhi to meet then Indian President, Shankar Dayal Sharma.

2000s
In 1999, Sagoo launched his own UK music label, Ishq Records. Its first output was his album, Dub of Asia. Ishq followed this with the release of other Sagoo titles including Anything But Silent, Hanji and the technical Sag Loops series. The label also managed and showcased other new talents and delivered tracks such as "Noorie" on Sagoo's 2000 release, Bollywood Flashback 2.

In 2003 at the UK Asian Awards, the Spice Girls presented him with the inaugural trophy for Outstanding Achievement.

That decade, Sagoo's music supported Gurinder Chadha's hit Bend It Like Beckham, Mira Nair's Monsoon Wedding (2001), the Aishwarya Rai and Dylan McDermott drama The Mistress of Spices and It's a Wonderful Afterlife. Sagoo also starred in and composed the music for the 2006 Punjabi film, Sajna ve Sajna. He appeared in television programmes during the 2010s, including the UK Lottery show, the Asian reality show Bollywood Star and celebrity magazine formats such as Tinseltown TV.

2010s
In 2012 Sagoo opened a studio in Mumbai, and splits his time between the UK and India. He merged the business assets of Ishq Records into Fresh Dope Records, the music division of Fresh Dope Industries. It has a head office in Brussels and an operational satellite in Mumbai. It is engaged in feature film production, television, artist promotion and management, corporate participation, online and traditional publishing, live performances, lifestyle products, fashion trends and technology developments.

Discography

See also 
 List of British Sikhs

References

External links
 Bally Sagoo website

Living people
1964 births
Asian Underground musicians
Bhangra (music) musicians
British Sikhs
Indian emigrants to the United Kingdom
Desi musicians
British DJs
British record producers
Musicians from Delhi
Musicians from Birmingham, West Midlands